Kaun may refer to:

Art and entertainment 
 Kaun?, a 1999 Hindi film
 Kaun? Kaisey?, a 1983 Hindi film
 Kaun (song), a song by Indian Ocean from album Kandisa

Other uses 
 The Old Norse name of the k rune; see Kaunan
 Káun, the Hungarian name of Căoi village, Vețel Commune, Hunedoara County, Romania
 The ICAO location identifier for Auburn Municipal Airport
 KAUN-LD, an American low-power television station
 Sasha Kaun (born 1985), Russian basketball player
 Kaun (wrestler), an American professional wrestler